Taxi No. 9 2 11 is a 2006 Indian Hindi-language comedy thriller film directed by Milan Luthria and produced by Ramesh Sippy. The film stars Nana Patekar along with John Abraham in lead roles. It released on 24 February 2006, received positive response from critics, and was a moderate success at the box office. It is loosely based on 2002 Hollywood  film Changing Lanes.

In 2009, it was remade in Tamil as TN-07 AL 4777 which stars Pasupathy and Ajmal Ameer and in 2019, in Burmese as Nyit Toon.

Plot
Taxi No. 9 2 11 focuses on Raghav Shastri (Nana Patekar), a cab driver in Mumbai who lies to his wife Sunita (Sonali Kulkarni) his job, pretending to be an insurance salesman. One day, he gives Jai Mittal (John Abraham), the spoilt son of a late businessman, a ride. Jai is fighting for ownership rights of his late father's estate. The cab gets into an accident with Jai escaping as he's in hurry. Jai loses the key to the vault containing his father's will in the back of Raghav's taxi.

Raghav decides to hide it from Jai. In the search for the key, Jai goes to Raghav's house and tells Sunita what he really does for a living, which Jai doesn't know. She leaves him, taking their son. Raghav decides to take revenge. Raghav and Jai vow to kill each other in their fight for their properties. When Raghav fails to kill Jai he targets Jai's girlfriend, Rupali (Sameera Reddy). As Raghav chases Rupali she is saved by Jai by hair's breadth. Jai lets Rupali escape and he attacks Raghav. They have a dirty car fight but both survive.

Raghav goes to Jai's place. Jai returns to his apartment from a second court hearing regarding his father's estate in defeat, because he doesn't have his father's will. He discovers the will, torn to pieces and pasted on the wall of his apartment. Jai becomes depressed and lonely after his friends leave him. Rupali dumps him, indicating she wanted him only for his fortune. Losing everything that used to be precious, Jai realises the hard-hitting life and starts respecting his father and his work.

On the other side Raghav is caught again by police and taken to police station where Sunita tells him his real character and problem within himself. Soon, he realises his mistake. Jai, having realised the value of close ones, then bails Raghav out of jail. Raghav insists they have a drink and they go to Jai's house for one. They find out that they share the same birthday. Raghav gives back his will, which he had hidden in the sofa, and says that he had never destroyed it — the torn will on the wall is a fake. Raghav then goes to the railway station to stop Sunita and hia son from leaving him, but arrives a little too late. He goes back home where he sees a birthday cake on the table. He feels that he is hallucinating, but gets a pleasant shock when he sees Sunita and his son standing there, singing him a birthday song (and finds out that it was Jai who brought them back).

Jai confronts Arjun Bajaj (Shivaji Satam), the friend and custodian of the property of Jai's father, whom he tells that he has realised the value of life and does not want his father's property and takes a leave. Just as he drives out, his car collides with another car driven by a Woman (Priyanka Chopra), though initially both seem to be angry at each, later Jai apologizes and asks for her number, promising to pay for damages. The movie ends as both smile at each other and drive away; indicating a new romantic beginning.

Cast

 Nana Patekar as Raghav Shastri aka Raghu
 John Abraham as Jai Mittal           
 Sameera Reddy as Rupali
 Sonali Kulkarni as Sunita Shastri, Raghav's wife
 Kurush Deboo as Cyrus Batliwala
 Shivaji Satam as Arjun Bajaj
 Sanjay Dutt as Narrator
 Priyanka Chopra as Driver special appearance
 Akash Khurana as Shyam Mittal, Jai Mittal's father
 Nasser Abdullah as Advocate Shivraj Behl (Shiv)
 Smita Jaykar as Rupali's mother
 Rajesh Asthana as Car owner
 Ganesh Yadav as an Inspector
 Mangal Kenkre as Judge
 Ajay Jadhav as a Constable
 Master Ashwin Chitale as Rishabh Shastri, Raghav's son
 Shankar Sachdev as Tiwari
 Anuradha Chandan as School Principal
 Bharat as Jeweller
 Vaibhav Mathur as Paanwala
 Rajeev Pandey as Flat complex watchman
 Mohammad as Lottery guy

Crew
 Director: Milan Luthria
 Producer: Ramesh Sippy, Rohan Sippy & Hussain Shaikh
 Screenplay: Manoj Tyagi
 Story: Milan Luthria
 Dialogue: Rajat Arora
 Music: Vishal–Shekhar
 Cinematography: Karthik Vijay
 Choreography: Bosco–Caesar
 Lyrics: Dev Kohli & Vishal Dadlani
 Action: Abbas Ali Moghul
 Art Direction: Wasiq Khan
 Editing: Aarif Sheikh
 Costume Designs: Rocky S & Lajjo C

Soundtrack 

The music was composed by Vishal–Shekhar with lyrics by Vishal Dadlani and Dev Kohli. The movie has six songs with two remixes. It features a song sung by yesteryear music composer Bappi Lahiri. The soundtrack was released sometime in the third week of January 2006 under the label of Saregama HMV.

Track listing

Box office
Taxi No. 9 2 11 was one of the highest-grossing films of 2006. Nana Patekar and John Abraham were well applauded for their performances. Sonali Kulkarni was also appreciated.

References

External links
 

2006 films
Films set in Mumbai
2000s Hindi-language films
Indian remakes of American films
Films scored by Vishal–Shekhar
UTV Motion Pictures films
Films shot in Mumbai
Hindi films remade in other languages
Films directed by Milan Luthria
Indian comedy thriller films